Acacia deltoidea is a shrub of the genus Acacia and the subgenus Plurinerves that is endemic to north western Australia.

Description
Like most species of Acacia it has phyllodes rather than true leaves. The subsessile, imbricate phyllodes are patent to ascending with a cuneate to elliptic to triangular or broadly obdeltate shape. It blooms from March to August and produces yellow flowers.

Taxonomy
There are two recognised subspecies:
Acacia deltoidea subsp. ampla
Acacia deltoidea subsp. deltoidea

Distribution
It is native to an area in the West Kimberley region of Western Australia from along the Bonaparte Archipelago and Napier Bay in the west to around the Phillips Range, Kimberley Downs Station and Beverley Springs Station in the east. It is usually found growing in sandy soils over and around sandstone and quartzite.

See also
List of Acacia species

References

deltoidea
Acacias of Western Australia
Taxa named by Allan Cunningham (botanist)
Plants described in 1832